Thanthu Vitten Ennai is a 1991 Indian Tamil-language romantic drama film starring Vikram and Rohini. This was the last film directed by C. V. Sridhar. It was released on 21 June 1991.

Plot 

The story revolves around two graduates Rajasekhar and Surya who meet up in an accidental Interview. They develop love towards each other. Will destiny unite them or not makes the rest of story.

Cast 
Vikram as Raju
Rohini as Surya
Manorama
Sethu Vinayagam
Typist Gopu
Thideer Kannaiah
Bharathiraja in a guest appearance
Ravichandran in a guest appearance
Ramaprabha as Ravichandran's wife
 Ustad Zakir Hussain (tabla) in cameo role

Production
Vikram was cast in the film while working on En Kadhal Kanmani (1990) after being tipped off about the opportunity by his father, Vinod Raj. Director C. V. Sridhar had wanted to cast a debutant actor, so Vikram kept his involvement in his earlier project a secret from the director, in order to get the offer. It later became Sridhar's final film before his death in 2008. In 2013, Vikram revealed that he chose to work on the film with Sridhar, despite the celebrated director's declining career, as it could have marked a comeback.

Soundtrack 
The film had six songs composed by Ilaiyaraaja. The song "Mannavane" is set in the Carnatic raga Arabhi.

Reception 
N. Krishnaswamy of The Indian Express wrote, "The theme that Sridhar seems to be driving is nebulous, if indeed there is a theme".

References

External links 
 

1990s Tamil-language films
1991 films
1991 romantic drama films
Films directed by C. V. Sridhar
Films scored by Ilaiyaraaja
Indian romantic drama films